"Why Don't That Telephone Ring" is a song recorded by American country music artist Tracy Byrd.  It was released in October 30, 1993 as the third single from the album Tracy Byrd.  The song reached #39 on the Billboard Hot Country Singles & Tracks chart.  The song was written by Charles Quillen and Ron Hellard.

Chart performance

References

Songs about telephone calls
1993 singles
1993 songs
Tracy Byrd songs
Songs written by Ron Hellard
Songs written by Charles Quillen
Song recordings produced by Keith Stegall
MCA Records singles